This is a list of things named after Jawaharlal Nehru, the first Prime Minister of India. A Right to Information query raised in 2013 was answered saying that over 450 schemes, building, projects, institutions, etc. were named after the three family members (Jawaharlal Nehru, Indira Gandhi and Rajiv Gandhi) of Nehru–Gandhi family.

Awards 
 Jawaharlal Nehru Award
 Jawaharlal Nehru Fellowship

Educational institutions 
 Jawaharlal Institute of Postgraduate Medical Education and Research, Pondicherry
 Jawahar Bal Bhavan Thrissur, Kerala
 Jawahar Bharati College, Kavali, Andhra Pradesh
 Jawaharlal Nehru Centre for Advanced Scientific Research, Bangalore, Karanataka
 Jawaharlal Nehru Engineering College, Aurangabad, Maharashtra
 Jawaharlal Nehru Government Engineering College, Sunder Nagar, Himachal Pradesh
 Jawaharlal Nehru Krishi Vishwa Vidyalaya, Jabalpur, Madhya Pradesh
 Jawaharlal Nehru Medical College, Ajmer
 Jawaharlal Nehru Medical College, Aligarh
 Jawaharlal Nehru Medical College, Belgaum
 Jawaharlal Nehru Medical College, Bhagalpur
 Jawaharlal Nehru National College of Engineering, Shimoga, Karnataka
 Jawaharlal Nehru Rajkeeya Mahavidyalaya, Port Blair
 Jawaharlal Nehru Technological University, Anantapur, Andhra Pradesh
 Jawaharlal Nehru Technological University, Hyderabad, Telangana
 Jawaharlal Nehru Architecture and Fine Arts University, Hyderabad, Telangana
 Jawaharlal Nehru Technological University, Kakinada, Andhra Pradesh
 Jawaharlal Nehru University, New Delhi
 Nehru Arts, Science and Commerce College, Hubli, Karnataka
 Nehru Memorial College, Puthanampatti, Tiruchirappalli, Tamil Nadu
 Nehru Memorial College, Sullia, Karnataka
 Pt. Jawahar Lal Nehru Memorial Medical College, Raipur, Chhattisgarh
 Pt. Jawaharlal Nehru Institute of Business Management, Ujjain, Madhya Pradesh
 Shri Nehru Maha Vidyalaya College of Arts & Sciences, Coimbatore, Tamil Nadu
 Nehru Park, Didwana, Rajasthan
 Jawahar Science College

Jawahar Navodaya Vidyalayas 

 Jawahar Navodaya Vidyalaya, Ahmednagar
 Jawahar Navodaya Vidyalaya, Alappuzha
 Jawahar Navodaya Vidyalaya, Alipurduar
 Jawahar Navodaya Vidyalaya, Amroha
 Jawahar Navodaya Vidyalaya, Ashok Nagar
 Jawahar Navodaya Vidyalaya, Bagudi
 Jawahar Navodaya Vidyalaya Bahraich
 Jawahar Navodaya Vidyalaya, Ballia
 Jawahar Navodaya Vidyalaya, Bankura
 Jawahar Navodaya Vidyalaya, Barabanki
 Jawahar Navodaya Vidyalaya, Basdei
 Jawahar Navodaya Vidyalaya, Belpada
 Jawahar Navodaya Vidyalaya, Bhogaon
 Jawahar Navodaya Vidyalaya, Bilaspur
 Jawahar Navodaya Vidyalaya, Birbhum
 Jawahar Navodaya Vidyalaya, Bohani
 Jawahar Navodaya Vidyalaya Canacona
 Jawahar Navodaya Vidyalaya, Car Nicobar
 Jawahar Navodaya Vidyalaya, Churu
 Jawahar Navodaya Vidyalaya, Champhai
 Jawahar Navodaya Vidyalaya, Chandigarh
 Jawahar Navodaya Vidyalaya, Chendayadu
 Jawahar Navodaya Vidyalaya, Cooch Behar
 Jawahar Navodaya Vidyalaya, Daman
 Jawahar Navodaya Vidyalaya, Dakshin Dinajpur
 Jawahar Navodaya Vidyalaya, Dhalai Tripura
 Jawahar Navodaya Vidyalaya, Deoghar
 Jawahar Navodaya Vidyalaya, Diu
 Jawahar Navodaya Vidyalaya, Doda
 Jawahar Navodaya Vidyalaya, Durgapur
 Jawahar Navodaya Vidyalaya, East Sikkim
 Jawahar Navodaya Vidyalaya, Ernakulam
 Jawahar Navodaya Vidyalaya, Gajanur
 Jawahar Navodaya Vidyalaya, Golaghat
 Jawahar Navodaya Vidyalaya, Gomati
 Jawahar Navodaya Vidyalaya, Hamirpur
 Jawahar Navodaya Vidyalaya, Hooghly
 Jawahar Navodaya Vidyalaya, Idukki
 Jawahar Navodaya Vidyalaya, Indore
 Jawahar Navodaya Vidyalaya, Jaffarpur Kalan
 Jawahar Navodaya Vidyalaya, Jaswantpura
 Jawahar Navodaya Vidyalaya, Jojawar
 Jawahar Navodaya Vidyalaya, Jorhat
 Jawahar Navodaya Vidyalaya Kanpur
 Jawahar Navodaya Vidyalaya Kanpur Dehat
 Jawahar Navodaya Vidyalaya, Karaikal
 Jawahar Navodaya Vidyalaya, Karauli
 Jawahar Navodaya Vidyalaya, Kangra
 Jawahar Navodaya Vidyalaya, Kasaragod
 Jawahar Navodaya Vidyalaya, Khowai
 Jawahar Navodaya Vidyalaya, Khurai
 Jawahar Navodaya Vidyalaya, Kinnaur
 Jawahar Navodaya Vidyalaya, Kodagu
 Jawahar Navodaya Vidyalaya, Korba
 Jawahar Navodaya Vidyalaya, Korlahalli
 Jawahar Navodaya Vidyalaya, Kothali
 Jawahar Navodaya Vidyalaya, Kothipura Bilaspur
 Jawahar Navodaya Vidyalaya, Kottayam
 Jawahar Navodaya Vidyalaya, Kozhikode
 Jawahar Navodaya Vidyalaya, Kullu
 Jawahar Navodaya Vidyalaya, Lahaul and Spiti
 Jawahar Navodaya Vidyalaya, Madhubani
 Jawahar Navodaya Vidyalaya, Mahe
 Jawahar Navodaya Vidyalaya, Malappuram
 Jawahar Navodaya Vidyalaya, Mandaphia
 Jawahar Navodaya Vidyalaya, Mandi
 Jawahar Navodaya Vidyalaya, Mandya
 Jawahar Navodaya Vidyalaya, Megdong
 Jawahar Navodaya Vidyalaya, Middle Andaman
 Jawahar Navodaya Vidyalaya, Minicoy
 Jawahar Navodaya Vidyalaya, Mirzapur
 Jawahar Navodaya Vidyalaya, Mokokchung
 Jawahar Navodaya Vidyalaya, Mothuka, Faridabad
 Jawahar Navodaya Vidyalaya, Mundali
 Jawahar Navodaya Vidyalaya, Mungeshpur
 Jawahar Navodaya Vidyalaya, Narla
 Jawahar Navodaya Vidyalaya Nizamasagar
 Jawahar Navodaya Vidyalaya, North 24 Parganas
 Jawahar Navodaya Vidyalaya, North Goa
 Jawahar Navodaya Vidyalaya, North Sikkim
 Jawahar Navodaya Vidyalaya, North Tripura
 Jawahar Navodaya Vidyalaya, Pailapool
 Jawahar Navodaya Vidyalaya, Palakkad
 Jawahar Navodaya Vidyalaya, Paota, Jaipur
 Jawahar Navodaya Vidyalaya, Panchavati
 Jawahar Navodaya Vidyalaya, Patan
 Jawahar Navodaya Vidyalaya, Patiala
 Jawahar Navodaya Vidyalaya, Pathanamthitta
 Jawahar Navodaya Vidyalaya, Peddapuram
 Jawahar Navodaya Vidyalaya, Pfukhro Mao
 Jawahar Navodaya Vidyalaya, Porbandar
 Jawahar Navodaya Vidyalaya, Prakasam
 Jawahar Navodaya Vidyalaya, Puducherry
 Jawahar Navodaya Vidyalaya, Raichur
 Jawahar Navodaya Vidyalaya, Rampura
 Jawahar Navodaya Vidyalaya, Rayagada
 Jawahar Navodaya Vidyalaya, Sahibganj
 Jawahar Navodaya Vidyalaya, Shyampur
 Jawahar Navodaya Vidyalaya, Silvassa
 Jawahar Navodaya Vidyalaya, Sirmaur
 Jawahar Navodaya Vidyalaya, Sitapur
 Jawahar Navodaya Vidyalaya, Solan
 Jawahar Navodaya Vidyalaya, South 24 Parganas
 Jawahar Navodaya Vidyalaya, South Andaman
 Jawahar Navodaya Vidyalaya, South Garo Hills
 Jawahar Navodaya Vidyalaya, South Sikkim
 Jawahar Navodaya Vidyalaya, Theog
 Jawahar Navodaya Vidyalaya, Thiruvananthapuram
 Jawahar Navodaya Vidyalaya, Thrissur
 Jawahar Navodaya Vidyalaya, Una
 Jawahar Navodaya Vidyalaya, Uttar Dinajpur
 Jawahar Navodaya Vidyalaya, Valasapalle
 Jawahar Navodaya Vidyalaya, Veleru
 Jawahar Navodaya Vidyalaya, Wayanad
 Jawahar Navodaya Vidyalaya, West Champaran
 Jawahar Navodaya Vidyalaya, West Sikkim
 Jawahar Navodaya Vidyalaya, Yanam

Museums 
 Jawaharlal Nehru Museum, Itanagar
 Nehru Memorial Museum & Library
 Nehru Museum of Science and Technology

Ports 
 Jawaharlal Nehru Port

Parks and gardens 
 Jawaharlal Nehru Memorial Botanical Garden
 Jawaharlal Nehru Tropical Botanic Garden and Research Institute
 Nehru Park, Burnpur
 Nehru Park, Delhi
 Nehru Park, Guwahati
 Nehru Park, Coimbatore
 Nehru Park, Thrissur
 Nehru Zoological Park, Hyderabad
 Nehru Garden, Udaipur
 Nehru Garden, Jaipur
 Nehru Garden, Koynanagar
 Nehru Park Bokaro

Schemes
 Jawaharlal Nehru National Urban Renewal Mission

Sports 
 Nehru Cup (cricket)
 Nehru Cup (football)
 Nehru Trophy Boat Race

Stadiums 
 Jawaharlal Nehru Stadium (Chennai)
 Jawaharlal Nehru Stadium (Coimbatore)
 Jawaharlal Nehru Stadium (Delhi)
 Jawaharlal Nehru Stadium (Kochi)
 Jawaharlal Nehru Stadium (Shillong)
 Jawaharlal Nehru Stadium, Ghaziabad
 Jawaharlal Nehru Stadium, Tiruchirappalli
 Nehru Smarak Stadium
 Nehru Stadium, Durgapur
 Nehru Stadium, Guwahati
 Nehru Stadium, Hubli
 Nehru Stadium, Indore
 Nehru Stadium, Kottayam
 Nehru Stadium, Pune
 Nehru Stadium, Shimoga
 Nehru Stadium, Tumkur

Others 
 Jawahar Chowk
 Jawahar Circle
 Jawahar Dweep
 Jawahar Kala Kendra
 Jawahar LPS kurakkodu
 Jawahar Planetarium
 Jawahar Sagar Dam
 Jawahar Setu
 Jawahar Tunnel
 Jawaharlal Nehru Road, Kolkata (Chowringhee Road)
 Jawaharnagar (Gujarat Refinery)
 Nehru Brigade
 Nehru jacket
 Nehru Foundation for Development
 Nehru Nagar
 Nehru Place
 Nehru Planetarium
 Nehru Science Centre
 Nehru Setu
 Pandit Nehru bus station

See also 
 List of things named after B. R. Ambedkar
 List of things named after Indira Gandhi
 List of things named after Mahatma Gandhi

References 

Jawaharlal Nehru

Lists of things named after Indian politicians
Lists relating to prime ministers of India